New Agenda may refer to:

 New Agenda (album), a 1973 jazz album by Elvin Jones
 "New Agenda", a song from Janet Jackson's 1993 album, Janet
 Democratic Left (Ireland), an Irish political party, formerly named New Agenda
 The New Agenda, an organization devoted to the empowerment of women, founded by Amy Siskind in 2008

See also
 New Agenda Coalition, a group of countries negotiating on nuclear disarmament